And... Soul It Goes is the debut album by French rock band Century, released in 1986 by the label Clever. The song "Lover Why" reached the first place in France's music charts for seven weeks. In Brazil, the song was featured in the soundtrack for the soap opera Ti Ti Ti, as the theme for the characters Gaby and Pedro. 
The single "Jane" reached the #35 position in France.

The other singles "Gone with the Winner" and "Self Destruction"  did not enter any musical charts, but "Gone with the Winner" was used in the soundtrack for another soap opera, Hipertensão.

Track listing

References

1986 debut albums